The Smith & Wesson SD VE is a polymer-framed, striker-fired semi-automatic pistol series that the American company Smith & Wesson introduced in 2012.

History
The SD VE is a direct evolution of the Smith & Wesson SD and Smith & Wesson Sigma designs. The SD VE design has an improved self-defense trigger and a comfortable, ergonomic, textured grip. The SD VE also features an improved stainless steel barrel and slide that the SD lacked.

Design details
The SD VE is a striker fired semi-automatic pistol. This trigger system prevents the gun from discharging unless the trigger is fully depressed, even if the shooter drops the pistol. The SD's aggressive front- and back strap texturing and the textured finger locator help enhance the shooter's grip and reduce recoil.

Variants
The Smith & Wesson SD VE is available in 9×19mm Parabellum and .40 S&W calibers in either a standard capacity version (16+1-round SD9 VE and 14+1-round SD40 VE) or in a restricted capacity version (10+1-rounds for both calibers.)

References

External links
 Official page

.40 S&W semi-automatic pistols
9mm Parabellum semi-automatic pistols
Smith & Wesson semi-automatic pistols
Semi-automatic pistols of the United States